Minpon Shugi is one form of "democracy" based on monarchical sovereignty. The word Minpon Shugi is originated from Kayahara Kazan, and Yoshino Sakuzō found it useful to describe his thought. However, Yoshino said "I did not really believe that is a suitable word," and "I just used it because many people had already used the word." Minpon Shugi does not violate the imperial institution and thus is very important. This school of thought became widely accepted by people who were passionate to see a better political system in Japan, and so had an impact on Taishō Democracy and the general election law.

Contents of Minpon Shugi 
Minpon Shugi is one form of democracy that the political scientist Yoshino Sakuzō put forward in the book "Kensei no hongi o toite sono yushu no bi o nasu no michi o ronzu". Yoshino Sakuzō defined Minpon Shugi as "the policy in exercising political power of valuing the profit, happiness, and opinions of the people." This has two main points:

First,"the ultimate end of the exercise of political power should be the good of the people." In the ancient world, the people were only treated as tools for the survival and prosperity of powerful politicians, and their retention of power. Since the Middle Age, the center of politics became the warrior class, and the people were just the foundation. Even though some politicians at that time, such as Arai Hakuseki, argued the necessity of love for the people, it was only for the sake of the upper classes. Yoshino considered that these structural ideas that sacrifice the human dignity for the interests of a few powerful people were awful and should be rejected.

Second, "in the final determination of policies, the people's opinions must be valued highly." It should be up to the people to decide the purpose of politics because people can understand better what is good for the people in general.

The Differences between Minshu Shugi and Minpon Shugi  
There are multiple possible translations of “democracy” in Japanese. Most people translate “democracy” into Minshu Shugi, and also Japan follows a Minshu Shugi political system currently. However, at the time of Yoshino’s writing, Minshu Shugi was thought to be contravened due to incompatibility with the imperial system. Because the Dai-Nippon Teikoku Kenpō (大日本帝国憲法) (Meiji Constitution) specified Constitutional Monarchy, people criticized it, saying that "democracy" entails sovereignty of the people. Yoshino stated that there are at least two meanings of "democracy". First, “in law the sovereignty of the nation resides in the people.” Second, “in politics the fundamental end of the exercise of the nation’s sovereignty should be the people.” He described that Minpon Shugi is a translation of the second meaning of “democracy”, and therefore it is different from Minshu Shugi in which sovereignty resides in the people. One of the most important elements of Minpon Shugi is that Yoshino flexibly adapted “democracy” to Japanese society at that time. The most crucial difference between Minshu Shugi and Minpon Shugi is the definition of where sovereignty lies.

Terminology 
Minshu Shugi is written in Chinese Characters as "民主主義". The difference between the two nouns is one Chinese Character 主 and 本. 主[Shu] means both "the first concern" and "sovereignty", represented by the same Chinese character in Japanese, and 本 [Pon] means "the base". So, the direct translation from Chinese characters of the word "Minshu Shugi" is "the principle that sovereignty resides with the people", and "Minpon Shugi" is "the principle that the people form the base".

Minshu Shugi 
In Yoshino's theory, Minshu Shugi, democracy based on popular sovereignty, also has two kinds, and one should be completely avoided but the other is not necessarily dangerous. The first, which Yoshino called "absolute popular sovereignty," was defined as sovereignty lying with the people naturally. This standpoint denies the monarchical system because it would mean the monarch derived authority from the people. Yoshino considered it to be clear that this kind of “Minshu Shugi” was a dangerous concept. In the second, which Yoshino called "popular sovereignty by mutual consent," popular sovereignty has been decided by interpretation of a constitution. Yoshino considered that it may not be evil because it does not reject the monarchical system. However, both kinds of Minshu Shugi have a problem with where they placed sovereignty. Japan at the time of Yoshino's writing was imperial system, and these definitions of sovereignty were incompatible with that system.

Minpon Shugi  
On the other hand, since Minpon Shugi, democracy based on monarchical sovereignty, "is not contingent on where legal theory locates sovereignty," which means the emperor can retain sovereignty. Therefore, the principle of Minpon Shugi does not clash with the monarchical system.

Criticism

Minpon Shugi 
When Yoshino was writing his articles, there were some criticisms against Minpon Shugi. Yoshino selected some of those opinions and refuted them in his writing. At first, people castigated the idea of Minpon Shugi itself. Yoshino argued that some people do not distinguish between Minpon Shugi and Minshu Shugi. Also, Yoshino said that "it's true that the history of constitutional government is full of revolutions" in response to the people who said Minpon Shugi is allied with Minshu Shugi and incompatible with monarchy because it has revolutionary tendencies. However, he added "Regardless of the revolutionary origins, trying to get rid of them is wrong" because "progress requires strenuous effort."

Objective of the Political System 
Some also felt apprehensive about the foundations of Yoshino's Minpon Shugi. Some pointed out that the principle, "The goal of politics is the good of the people in general" would go against the Japanese spirit of loyalty due to conflict between the good of the Imperial Family and the people's good. However, Yoshino claimed there is no contradiction between the Imperial Family's interests and the good of the people because there is only one Imperial Family in Japan and it does not conflict with the interests of the people. Even if it were to come into conflict with the Imperial Family's interests, Minpon Shugi just makes a statement about the general policy of the sovereign, it does not lay down a rigid law. Moreover, he claimed that the sovereign should treat the people in a good way in general, so the only people who would disagree are the privileged ones.

Political Decisionmaking 
People suggested that Yoshino's statement, "Policies should be decided with input from the people's opinion" goes against the spirit of the monarchist constitution. Yoshino rebutted this criticism, and said it was also due to misunderstanding. The sovereign still has full sovereignty in law. Minpon Shugi only describes the policy of the sovereign in the exercise of its sovereignty. Some criticized Minpon Shugi for imposing restrictions on the actions of the sovereign. Yoshino refuted this criticism, saying "The actions of the sovereign have already been restricted, since the Constitution is a limitation," and "Limitations are in fact desirable and moral."

Furthermore, some well-educated men claimed the people in general were not intelligent enough to join politics. Yoshino said because of educational progress, the intelligence of the people became quite high. Additionally, people just need to have some common sense to make decisions; they were not being asked to create new policy.

There was thought that the general will, the will of the people does not exist, it does not actively move in one direction; however, according to Yoshino, the will of the people exists, and while it may sway that will, the essential direction is the same.

Criticism after Yoshino's Writing 
After Yoshino's book, "On the Meaning of Constitutional Government and the Method by which it can be Perfected", several socialists such as Ōsugi Sakae and Yamakawa Hitoshi criticized the ideas of Yoshino. Ōsugi Sakae strongly opposed these ideas, saying "Everywhere it's vague. It's full of contradictions. It's incoherent." They particularly criticized how Yoshino separated "place of sovereignty" and "exercise of sovereignty".

References 

Politics of Japan
Democracy
Taishō period